László Horváth may refer to:

Sportspeople
 László Horváth (footballer, born 1901), Hungarian footballer, was league top scorer with Ferencváros
 László Horváth (footballer, born 1944), Hungarian footballer, played the 1965 Inter-Cities Fairs Cup Final with Ferencváros
 László Horváth (footballer, born 1988), Hungarian footballer
 László Horváth (modern pentathlete) (born 1946), Hungarian pentathlete

Others
 László Horváth (actor) (1943-1988), Hungarian actor, featured in Cserepek, Hungarian Rhapsody, Forbidden Relations or A járvány
 László Horváth (politician) (born 1962), Hungarian politician